William F. Thompson (1852 — ?) was a lawyer, law school teacher, justice of the peace, tax assessor, state legislator, and delegate to Florida's 1885 Constitutional Convention.

Biography 
Thompson was born October 15, 1852 in Thomas County, Georgia and his only formal education was in common schools. He was African American.

He was married, had two children and was a member of the African Methodist Church.

Thomson was appointed as Justice of the Peace from 1872 until 1873 and again in 1874.

He represented Leon County, Florida in the Florida House of Representatives in 1877 as a Republican. 

In 1884 he served as the city tax assessor for Tallahassee, Florida and again in 1887.

He was a delegate at the 1885 Florida Constitutional Convention also representing Leon County.
At the convention he voted for the article for education to establish, maintain and manage normal schools funded by a poll tax with equal distribution for "white and colored children", even though it included segregation. He was a signatory on the final Constitution of 1885 signed August 3, 1885.

His death is unknown but he was still alive in Tallahassee in 1891.

See also
 African-American officeholders during and following the Reconstruction era

References

People from Thomas County, Georgia
People from Leon County, Florida
African-American Methodists

1852 births
Year of death missing
19th-century American politicians
African-American state legislators in Florida
Republican Party members of the Florida House of Representatives
Methodists from Florida
American justices of the peace
19th-century African-American politicians